The 1973 Rainier International Tennis Classic, also known as the Seattle International, was a men's tennis tournament staged at the Seattle Center Arena in Seattle, Washington in the United States that was part of the Grand Prix circuit and categorized as a Group C event. The tournament was played on indoor carpet courts and was held from September 10 until September 16, 1973. It was the second and last edition of the tournament and second-seeded Tom Okker won the singles title and earned $7,500 first-prize money as well as 20 ranking points.

Finals

Singles

 Tom Okker defeated  John Alexander 7–5, 6–4
 It was Okker's 4th singles title of the year and the 24th of his career in the Open Era.

Doubles

 Tom Gorman /  Tom Okker defeated  Bob Carmichael /  Frew McMillan 2–6, 6–4, 7–6

References

External links
 ITF tournament edition details

Rainier International Tennis Classic
Rainier International Tennis Classic
Rainier International Tennis Classic, 1973